Fabio Carpi (19 January 1925 – 26 December 2018) was an Italian director, screenwriter, and author.

Life and career 
Born in Milan, in the 1940s Carpi began his career as a film critic for the newspapers Libera Stampa and L'Unità. In 1951 he moved to Brasil, where he started collaborating to some screenplays. Returned in Italy in 1954, until 1971 he was active as a screenwriter  for notable directors such as Antonio Pietrangeli, Dino Risi and Vittorio De Seta. In 1971 he won a Nastro d'Argento for the screenplay of  Nelo Risi's Diary of a Schizophrenic Girl. Starting from 1957 he was also  a critically acclaimed novelist and essayist. His novel Patchwork won the Bagutta Prize in 1998.

After a 1968 documentary short, in 1972 Carpi made his feature film debut with the drama Corpo d'amore. His films were referred to as "figuratively accurate, literary,  often metaphorical and difficult to understand", "deep explorations of the human psyche".

Selected filmography 
 A Flea on the Scales (1953, only screenwriter)
 The Peaceful Age (1974)
 Basileus Quartet (1983)
 Barbablù, Barbablù (1987)
 Necessary Love (1991)
 Next Time the Fire  (1993)

References

External links 
 

1925 births
2018 deaths
Italian film directors
Italian television directors
Italian screenwriters
Film people from Milan
20th-century Italian novelists
20th-century Italian male writers
Italian essayists
Italian male novelists
Male essayists
20th-century essayists
Italian male screenwriters
Italian male non-fiction writers